Thaumatopsis crenulatella is a moth in the family Crambidae. It was described by William D. Kearfott in 1908. It is found in the US states of Arizona, California, Colorado and Nevada.

References

Crambini
Moths described in 1908
Moths of North America